The highest-selling albums and EPs in the United States are ranked in the Billboard 200, which is published by Billboard magazine. The data are compiled by Nielsen Soundscan based on each album's weekly physical and digital sales. In 1989, 15 albums advanced to the peak position of the chart.

Bobby Brown's Don't Be Cruel was the best performing and best-selling album of 1989, spending 6 non-consecutive weeks at number one.

The Raw & the Cooked, the second album by rock and soul band Fine Young Cannibals, had the longest run among the releases that reached peak position in 1989, spending 7 consecutive weeks in the top position.

The 1989 debut album Girl You Know It's True, by the pop group Milli Vanilli. The album spent 7 non-consecutive weeks in the top position.

Chart history

See also
 1989 in music

References

1989
United States Albums